
Samuel Hill (c. 1765 – c. 1809) was an engraver who worked in Boston, Massachusetts, in the late 18th and early 19th centuries. His engravings were published in the Massachusetts Magazine; Defoe's New Robinson Crusoe (1790); Lavater's Essays on Physiognomy (1794); American Universal Geography (1796); Cook's Three Voyages to the Pacific Ocean (1797). Hill's subjects extended from maps to literary illustrations to landscapes; portrait subjects included James Bowdoin, Rev. John Murray of Newburyport, Massachusetts, and Elizabeth White (d. 1798). Examples of Hill's work can be found in the American Antiquarian Society, Massachusetts Historical Society, and Museum of Fine Arts, Boston.

Scholars continue debating the precise dates of Hill's birth and death. Suggested candidates for Hill's lifespan: born July 27, 1750, "probably the son of Alexander and Thankful Hill"; 1765–1809; and 1766?–1804.

References

Further reading

External links
Library of Congress. North View of Castle William
Flickr. 1796 North Western Territory map
Massachusetts Historical Society. Map of Massachusetts Proper, 1802

American engravers
Artists from Boston
18th-century American people
1760s births
1800s deaths
Year of birth uncertain
Year of death uncertain
18th century in Boston